Donald Lines Jacobus, FASG (1887-1970) of New Haven, Connecticut, is widely regarded among genealogists as the dean of American genealogy.

In his publications and teachings, Jacobus emphasized the importance of a scientific method of using primary sources in genealogical research. This replaced the idea of oral traditions and acceptance of time-honored pedigrees as facts due to their age. He provided the first basics of proper documentation and citation for all genealogists. While he endorsed the concept of eugenics he felt it was seriously lacking in the ability to properly trace bloodlines nor were those proponents of the field experienced enough in genealogical research or ability.

He established the New Haven Genealogical Magazine in 1922, which became The American Genealogist (TAG) ten years later. He served as the periodical's editor and publisher for 43 years until 1966.

Early life and education
Jacobus was born at New Haven, Connecticut, the only child of John Ira Jacobus (1855-1912), a banker, and Ida Wilmot Lines (1855-1952), daughter of Henry Lines. The Jacobus family were Dutch, recorded at Albany, New York in 1683.

Jacobus was educated at Yale University, taking a BA in 1908 and MA in 1911.

Career
In his youth, Jacobus had been interested in family histories and relationships, and spent much of his time visiting the offices of New Haven's Town Clerk; at sixteen, genealogical articles he wrote were published in a Connecticut magazine. Having left Yale, and with no desire to teach, Jacobus turned to genealogy; aside from working as secretary of the New Haven Building and Loan Association from 1912 to 1917, and serving in the U.S. Army between 1917 and 1919, during which periods he was already compiling material on ancient New Haven families in his spare time, he spent the rest of his life focused on genealogical research and publication.

Writings
Jacobus was a prolific writer. Besides his numerous magazine articles, his published works, of which he produced over a dozen, include:

 Genealogy as Pastime and Profession, published in 1930.
 History and Genealogy of the Families of Old Fairfield, a three-volume work sponsored by the local Daughters of the American Revolution chapter in Fairfield, Connecticut, from 1930 to 1932.
 Families of ancient New Haven
Hale, House, And Related Families, Mainly of the Connecticut River Valley
The Hazen Family in America: A Genealogy
A History of the Seymour Family: Descendants of Richard Seymour of Hartford, Connecticut, for Six Generations; With Extensive Amplification of the Lines Deriving from His Son John Seymour of Hartford
The American genealogist.

A list of eleven of his books can be found at: Books by Donald Lines Jacobus (Author of Genealogy as Pastime and Profession)

Awards
In recognition of his contributions to genealogy, Jacobus was the first person inducted into the National Genealogy Hall of Fame. He was nominated for this honor by the American Society of Genealogists, the Genealogical Society of Utah, and the DuPage County (IL) Genealogical Society.

In 1972, the American Society of Genealogists created The Donald Lines Jacobus Award to promote genealogical writing using sound scholarship. Jacobus promoted the application of the scientific method to genealogical research by placing emphasis on primary source documentation. Previously, most time-honored pedigrees were created using unverified oral family history. His novel research strategy was made possible once early church records and grave stones were index and transcribed by heraldic societies, the Church of LDS, and government agencies.

Jacobus was one of the earliest Fellows of the American Society of Genealogists, an Honor Society of fifty members chosen on the basis of the significance of their contributions to genealogy.  On his death, he was described by his colleague Milton Rubincam, as "the man who more than any other single individual elevated genealogy to the high degree of scholarship it now occupies."

Personal life
"He never married and was devoted to his widowed mother throughout her life. His favorite hobby was charting the descendants of Spain’s King Ferdinand and Queen Isabella (Ferdie and Izzie as he called them), demonstrating that as serious as genealogy had become for him, it was also bound up in fun and fantasy."

Jacobus died at the Golden Manor Nursing Home at New Haven, Connecticut, after a long illness.

References

External links
 The National Genealogical Society, Home.
 David L. Greene, "Donald Lines Jacobus, Scholarly Genealogy, and The American Genealogist," The American Genealogist, July/October 1997, pages 159–180.
 The Donald Lines Jacobus Award, Jacobus Award
 The American Genealogist, Home
 National Genealogical Society, National Genealogical Society | NGS Genealogy Hall of Fame Members
 
 National Genealogy Hall of Fame Member - Donald Lines Jacobus

1887 births
1970 deaths
Writers from New Haven, Connecticut
Jacobus, Donald Lines
20th-century American historians
20th-century American male writers
Fellows of the American Society of Genealogists
Historians from Connecticut
American male non-fiction writers